The ASOP (A Song of Praise) Music Festival is an annual music festival held in Metro Manila, Philippines. Basically a songwriting competition, it is the only gospel music television program in the country. An original concept of Bro. Eli Soriano and Daniel Razon aiming to bring back praise songs to the public, it started in 2004 as a music competition inside the Members Church of God International but was later opened to the general public in 2011. The music festival also discourages rap and metal music entries.

The program airs weekly on UNTV every Sunday night holding weekly and monthly eliminations. The show is hosted by Ninang Toni and balladeer Richard Reynoso. For the first 6 years (2012-2017), the Grand Finals were held in Smart Araneta Coliseum, Quezon City. Starting in 2018, the Finals are held in nearby New Frontier Theater, Quezon City. Since 2015, entries that won from the monthly eliminations of November of the current year to October of the following year are included in the Grand Finals Night.

On its third year, the multi-awarded Filipino actor and film director, Cesar Montano and Filipina actress, Lilet joined the competition with their compositions entitled Pagpupuring Walang Hanggan (Eternal Praise), and You Are Lord of All, respectively.

ASOP Music Festival was crowned the Best Talent Search Program of the 29th PMPC Star Awards for Television. As announced by Daniel Razon on the Year 7 Grand Finals, starting Year 8, the cash prize will be ₱800,000 for the champion, and a yearly increment of ₱100,000 will be added to the grand prize.

Hosts 
 Ninang Toni (2011–present)
 Richard Reynoso (2011–present)

Grand Winners

Events 
NOTE: Tagalog song titles presented in this table are provided with English translations.

Year 7 (2017–2018) 

 Date: November 11, 2018
 Venue: New Frontier Theater, Araneta Center, Cubao, Quezon City
 Judges: Rannie Raymundo, Boy Christopher Ramos, Mon Del Rosario, Pat Castillo, Jose Javier Reyes, and Fides Cuyugan-Asensio 
 Hosts: Richard Reynoso and Ninang Toni

The ASOP Year 7 Grand Finals night was held at the New Frontier Theater, Cubao, Quezon City on November 11, 2018, and had its simultaneous TV premiere at UNTV and online premiere at Youtube on December 30, 2018.

"Tugtog", a song entry composed by John Paul Salazar and interpreted by Bradz was named as the grand champion among 12 finalists. Blind composer Jeffrey Lim won the special award Bro. Eli Soriano's Choice for the song "Hiling", while LJ Manzano's "Banal Mong Salita" bagged the People's Choice Award. Cello Nuñez was hailed as the Best Interpreter.

Wish 107.5 products The Wishfuls performed at the event.

After the Grand Finals, "Banal Mong Salita" was used as the soundtrack of Ang Dating Daan's 38th anniversary short film "Banal Na Salita" (Holy Word).

{| class="wikitable sortable" border="1"
|-
! Result
! Song 
! Composer(s) 
! Interpreter(s) 
! Prize
|-
| style="text-align:center;"| —
| style="text-align:center;"| Pagbabalik (Return)
| style="text-align:center;"| Joel Jabelosa
| style="text-align:center;"| Marcelito Pomoy
| style="text-align:center;"| ₱20,000
|-
| style="text-align:center;"| —
| style="text-align:center;"| Hiling (Wish)
| style="text-align:center;"| Jeffrey Lim
| style="text-align:center;"| Plethora
| style="text-align:center;"| ₱20,000
|-
| style="text-align:center;"| —
| style="text-align:center;"| Makikita Kita (I'll See You)
| style="text-align:center;"| Joyner Dizon
| style="text-align:center;"| Dan Billano
| style="text-align:center;"| ₱20,000
|-
| style="text-align:center;"| —
| style="text-align:center;"| 'Wag Kang Bibitiw (Don't Give Up)
| style="text-align:center;"| Oliver Narag
| style="text-align:center;"| Jessa Mae Gabon
| style="text-align:center;"| ₱20,000
|-bgcolor="#ccccff"
| style="text-align:center;"| 3rd Runner-up
| style="text-align:center;"| Di na 'ko Aawit (I Won't Sing)
| style="text-align:center;"| Rommel Gojo
| style="text-align:center;"| Hans Dimayuga
| style="text-align:center;"| ₱200,000
|-
| style="text-align:center;"| —
| style="text-align:center;"| Binago Mo Ako (You Changed Me)
| style="text-align:center;"| Jett Villareal
| style="text-align:center;"| Daryl Ong
| style="text-align:center;"| ₱20,000
|-
| style="text-align:center;"| —
| style="text-align:center;"| Magpatuloy sa Mabuting Paggawa (Continue Doing Good Things)
| style="text-align:center;"| Febs Colibao
| style="text-align:center;"| Ato Arman
| style="text-align:center;"| ₱20,000
|-bgcolor="#fdb"
| style="text-align:center;"| 2nd Runner-up
| style="text-align:center;"| God is with Us| style="text-align:center;"| Emmanuel Lipio Jr.
| style="text-align:center;"| Cello Nuñez
| style="text-align:center;"| ₱250,000
|-
| style="text-align:center;"| —
| style="text-align:center;"| Salamat Panginoon (Thank You Lord)
| style="text-align:center;"| Rex Torremoro and Elmar Jan Bolaño
| style="text-align:center;"| Mark Carpio
| style="text-align:center;"| ₱20,000
|-bgcolor="gold"
| style="text-align:center;"| Grand Champion
| style="text-align:center;"| Tugtog (Play)
| style="text-align:center;"| John Paul Salazar
| style="text-align:center;"| Bradz
| style="text-align:center;"| ₱500,000
|-
| style="text-align:center;"| —
| style="text-align:center;"| Banal Mong Salita (Your Sacred Word)
| style="text-align:center;"| LJ Manzano
| style="text-align:center;"| Mark Michael Garcia
| style="text-align:center;"| ₱20,000
|-bgcolor="silver"
| style="text-align:center;"| 1st Runner-up
| style="text-align:center;"| Isang Milyong Pasasalamat (A Million Thanks)
| style="text-align:center;"| Edward Salde
| style="text-align:center;"| Leah Patricio
| style="text-align:center;"| ₱300,000
|}

Special Awards:

 Year 8 (2018–2019) 

The eighth year of competition included entries from November 2018 to October 2019 episodes. As announced during the Year 7 Grand Finals, the grand prize for Year 8 is raised from ₱500,000 to ₱800,000.

 Qualification 

 Notes

 An asterisk (*) denotes a change of interpreter for the Grand Finals. A dagger (†) denotes a "Producer's Pick" weekly winner. A double dagger (‡) denotes a change of song title for the Grand Finals. "Don't Give Up" reached the November 2018 Monthly Finals and lost, but was recalled for a February 2019 "Producer's Pick" episode. "Libo-libong Tala" reached the March 2019 Monthly Finals and lost, but was recalled for a May 2019 "Producer's Pick" episode. Rhap Salazar performed the song on May Weekly Finals, while Gidget Dela Llana sang on the May Monthly Finals and also the Grand Finals. The title was changed to "Sa 'Di Mabilang Na Tala" for the Grand Finals. "Sagwan" reached the July 2019 Monthly Finals and lost, but was recalled for an August 2019 "Producer's Pick" episode. The title of "Ulap" was changed to "Tahan Na" for the Grand Finals.''

 Results 

 Date: November 10, 2019
 Venue: New Frontier Theater, Araneta City, Cubao, Quezon City
 Judges: Mon Del Rosario, Miguel Benjamin of Ben&Ben, Boboy Garovillo, Dr. Arnel De Pano, Jackie Lou Blanco, Lani Misalucha, Prof. Felipe De Leon Jr.
 Hosts: Richard Reynoso and Ninang Toni

The ASOP Year 8 Grand Finals night was held at the New Frontier Theater, Cubao, Quezon City on November 10, 2019.

"Sa 'Di Mabilang Na Tala", a song entry composed by Carlo David and interpreted by Gidget Dela Llana, was named as the grand champion among 12 finalists, and also bagged the People's Choice Award. David became the first and only two-time winner in the program's history.

Ethan Loukas was hailed as the Best Interpreter, while Bro. Eli Soriano's Choice are the regulars of the show, hosts Richard Reynoso and Ninang Toni, and resident judge Mon Del Rosario.

Wish 107.5 Wishcovery winners Princess Sevillena, Rhea Basco, Tawag ng Tanghalan finalist Violeta Bayawa, Plethora, Ace Bartolome and Carmela Ariola of The Wishfuls, Jason Dy, Leah Patricio, and Bradz performed at the event.Special Awards:'''

Awards and recognition 

The ASOP 2012 commemorative album is awarded as Inspirational Album of the Year in the 5th PMPC Star Awards for Music in Manila, Philippines.

See also
 Ang Dating Daan
 Members Church of God International
 Radyo La Verdad 1350
 UNTV News & Rescue
 Wish 107.5

References 

Members Church of God International
Gospel music festivals
Philippine music awards
Song contests
2011 establishments in the Philippines
Music festivals in the Philippines
Annual events in the Philippines
Music festivals established in 2011
Festivals in Metro Manila